Evesham Road Crossing Halt railway station served the town of Stratford-upon-Avon, Warwickshire, England from 1904 to 1916 on the Gloucestershire Warwickshire Railway.

History 
The station opened as Evesham Road Crossing Halte on 17 October 1904 by the Great Western Railway. The spelling of the suffix 'halte' was corrected to 'halt' in April 1905. Being a halt, it was unmanned beside the nearby signal box which opened circa 1891 and operated the level crossing. The station closed on 14 July 1916, closing as a wartime economy measure but never opening again.

References

External links 

Disused railway stations in Warwickshire
Former Great Western Railway stations
Railway stations in Great Britain opened in 1904
Railway stations in Great Britain closed in 1916
1904 establishments in England
1916 disestablishments in England